Pütsep is an Estonian occupational surname, literally meaning "cooper". The surname may refer to:

Eduard Pütsep (1898–1960), wrestler
Erki Pütsep (born 1976), road bicycle racer

Estonian-language surnames
Occupational surnames